Rutherglen is a constituency of the Scottish Parliament (Holyrood) covering part of the council area of South Lanarkshire. It elects one Member of the Scottish Parliament (MSP) by the plurality (first past the post) method of election. Also, it is one of nine constituencies in the Glasgow electoral region, which elects seven additional members, in addition to the nine constituency MSPs, to produce a form of proportional representation for the region as a whole.

Originally called Glasgow Rutherglen, the boundaries were redrawn and the new constituency renamed simply Rutherglen for the 2011 Scottish Parliament election. The seat has been held by Clare Haughey of the Scottish National Party since the 2016 Scottish Parliament election.

Electoral region

The other eight constituencies of the Glasgow region are Glasgow Anniesland, Glasgow Cathcart, Glasgow Kelvin, Glasgow Maryhill and Springburn, Glasgow Pollok, Glasgow Provan, Glasgow Shettleston and Glasgow Southside.

The region covers the Glasgow City council area and a north-western portion of the South Lanarkshire council area.

Constituency boundaries and council areas

The redrawn seat of Rutherglen consists of the following electoral wards:

In full: Rutherglen South; Rutherglen Central and North; Cambuslang West; Cambuslang East
In part: Blantyre (shared with Uddingston and Bellshill)

Constituency profile
BBC profile for 2016 election:

Member of the Scottish Parliament

Election results

2020s

2010s
 

 

Previous elections: See Glasgow Rutherglen.

References

External links

Cambuslang
Rutherglen
Blantyre, South Lanarkshire
Politics of Glasgow
Scottish Parliament constituencies and regions from 2011
Constituencies of the Scottish Parliament
2011 establishments in Scotland
Constituencies established in 2011
Politics of South Lanarkshire